In geodesy and navigation, a meridian arc is the curve between two points on the Earth's surface having the same longitude. The term may refer either to a segment of the meridian, or to its length. 

The purpose of measuring meridian arcs is to determine a figure of the Earth.
One or more measurements of meridian arcs can be used to infer the shape of the reference ellipsoid that best approximates the geoid in the region of the measurements. Measurements of meridian arcs at several latitudes along many meridians around the world can be combined in order to approximate a geocentric ellipsoid intended to fit the entire world.

The earliest determinations of the size of a spherical Earth required a single arc. Accurate survey work beginning in the 19th century required several arc measurements in the region the survey was to be conducted, leading to a proliferation of reference ellipsoids around the world. The latest determinations use astro-geodetic measurements and the methods of satellite geodesy to determine reference ellipsoids, especially the geocentric ellipsoids now used for global coordinate systems such as WGS 84 (see numerical expressions).

History of measurement

Early estimations of Earth's size are recorded from Greece in the 4th century BC, and from scholars at the caliph's House of Wisdom in the 9th century. The first realistic value was calculated by Alexandrian scientist Eratosthenes about 240 BC. He estimated that the meridian has a length of 252,000 stadia, with an error on the real value between -2.4% and +0.8% (assuming a value for the stadion between 155 and 160 metres). Eratosthenes described his technique in a book entitled On the measure of the Earth, which has not been preserved. A similar method was used by Posidonius about 150 years later, and slightly better results were calculated in 827 by the arc measurement method, attributed to the Caliph Al-Ma'mun.

Ellipsoidal Earth

Early literature uses the term oblate spheroid to describe a sphere "squashed at the poles". Modern literature uses the term ellipsoid of revolution in place of spheroid, although the qualifying words "of revolution" are usually dropped. An ellipsoid that is not an ellipsoid of revolution is called a triaxial ellipsoid. Spheroid and ellipsoid are used interchangeably in this article, with oblate implied if not stated.

17th and 18th centuries
Although it had been known since classical antiquity that the Earth was spherical, by the 17th century, evidence was accumulating that it was not a perfect sphere. In 1672, Jean Richer found the first evidence that gravity was not constant over the Earth (as it would be if the Earth were a sphere); he took a pendulum clock to Cayenne, French Guiana and found that it lost  minutes per day compared to its rate at Paris.  This indicated the acceleration of gravity was less at Cayenne than at Paris. Pendulum gravimeters began to be taken on voyages to remote parts of the world, and it was slowly discovered that gravity increases smoothly with increasing latitude, gravitational acceleration being about 0.5% greater at the geographical poles than at the Equator.

This was disputed by some, but not all, French scientists. A meridian arc of Jean Picard was extended to a longer arc by Giovanni Domenico Cassini and his son Jacques Cassini  over the period 1684–1718. The arc was measured with at least three latitude determinations, so they were able to deduce mean curvatures for the northern and southern halves of the arc, allowing a determination of the overall shape. The results indicated that the Earth was a prolate spheroid (with an equatorial radius less than the polar radius). To resolve the issue, the French Academy of Sciences (1735) proposed expeditions to Peru (Bouguer, Louis Godin, de La Condamine, Antonio de Ulloa, Jorge Juan) and Lapland (Maupertuis, Clairaut, Camus, Le Monnier, Abbe Outhier, Anders Celsius). The expedition to Peru is described in the French Geodesic Mission article and that to Lapland is described in the French Geodesic Mission to Lapland article. The resulting measurements at equatorial and polar latitudes confirmed that the Earth was best modelled by an oblate spheroid, supporting Newton. However, by 1743, Clairaut's theorem had completely supplanted Newton's approach.

By the end of the century, Jean-Baptiste-Joseph Delambre had remeasured and extended the French arc from Dunkirk to the Mediterranean Sea (the meridian arc of Delambre and Méchain). It was divided into five parts by four intermediate determinations of latitude. By combining the measurements together with those for the arc of Peru,
ellipsoid shape parameters were determined and the distance between the Equator and pole along the Paris Meridian was calculated as  toises as specified by the standard toise bar in Paris. Defining this distance as exactly  led to the construction of a new standard metre bar as  toises.

19th century
In the 19th century, many astronomers and geodesists were engaged in detailed studies of the Earth's curvature along different meridian arcs. The analyses resulted in a great many model ellipsoids such as Plessis 1817, Airy 1830, Bessel 1830, Everest 1830, and Clarke 1866. A comprehensive list of ellipsoids is given under Earth ellipsoid.

The nautical mile
Historically a nautical mile was defined as the length of one minute of arc along a meridian of a spherical earth. An ellipsoid model leads to a variation of the nautical mile with latitude. This was resolved by defining the nautical mile to be exactly 1,852 metres.  However, for all practical purposes, distances are measured from the latitude scale of charts.  As the Royal Yachting Association says in its manual for day skippers: "1 (minute) of Latitude = 1 sea mile", followed by "For most practical purposes distance is measured from the latitude scale, assuming that one minute of latitude equals one nautical mile".

Calculation

On a sphere, the meridian arc length is simply the circular arc length.
On an ellipsoid of revolution, for short meridian arcs, their length can be approximated using the Earth's meridional radius of curvature and the circular arc formulation.
For longer arcs, the length follows from the subtraction of two meridian distances, the distance from the equator to a point at a latitude .
This is an important problem in the theory of map projections, particularly the transverse Mercator projection.

The main ellipsoidal parameters are, but in theoretical work it is useful to define extra parameters, particularly the eccentricity, and the third flattening . Only two of these parameters are independent and there are many relations between them:

Definition

The meridian radius of curvature can be shown  to be equal to:

Therefore, the meridian distance from the equator to latitude  is

The distance formula is simpler when written in terms of the
parametric latitude,

Even though latitude is normally confined to the range , all the formulae given here apply to measuring distance around the complete meridian ellipse (including the anti-meridian).

Relation to elliptic integrals

The above integral is related to a special case of an incomplete elliptic integral of the third kind. In the notation of the online NIST handbook (Section 19.2(ii)),

It may also be written in terms of incomplete elliptic integrals of the second kind (See the NIST handbook Section 19.6(iv)),

The calculation (to arbitrary precision) of the elliptic integrals and approximations are also discussed in the NIST handbook. These functions are also implemented in computer algebra programs such as Mathematica and Maxima.

Series expansions

The above integral may be expressed as an infinite truncated series by expanding the integrand in a Taylor series, performing the resulting integrals term by term, and expressing the result as a trigonometric series. In 1755, Leonhard Euler derived an expansion in the third eccentricity squared.

Expansions in the eccentricity

where

Richard Rapp gives a detailed derivation of this result.

Expansions in the third flattening

Series with considerably faster convergence can be obtained by expanding in terms of the third flattening  instead of the eccentricity. They are related by

In 1837, Friedrich Bessel obtained one such series, which was put into a simpler form by Helmert,

with

Even though this results in more slowly converging series, such series are used in the specification for the transverse Mercator projection by the National Geospatial Intelligence Agency and the Ordnance Survey of Great Britain.

Series in terms of the parametric latitude

In 1825, Bessel derived an expansion of the meridian distance in terms of the parametric latitude  in connection with his work on geodesics,

with

Because this series provides an expansion for the elliptic integral of the second kind, it can be used to write the arc length in terms of the geographic latitude as

Generalized series

The above series, to eighth order in eccentricity or fourth order in third flattening, provide millimetre accuracy.  With the aid of symbolic algebra systems, they can easily be extended to sixth order in the third flattening which provides full double precision accuracy for terrestrial applications.

Delambre and Bessel both wrote their series in a form that allows them to be generalized to arbitrary order.  The coefficients in Bessel's series can expressed particularly simply

where

The coefficients in Helmert's series can similarly be expressed generally by

This result was conjectured by Friedrich Helmert and proved by Kazushige Kawase.

Numerical expressions

The trigonometric series given above can be conveniently evaluated using Clenshaw summation. This method avoids the calculation of most of the trigonometric functions and allows the series to be summed rapidly and accurately. The technique can also be used to evaluate the difference  while maintaining high relative accuracy.

Substituting the values for the semi-major axis and eccentricity of the WGS84 ellipsoid gives

where  is  expressed in degrees (and similarly for ).

For WGS84 an approximate expression for the distance  between the two parallels at ±0.5° from the circle at latitude  is given by

Quarter meridian

The distance from the equator to the pole, the quarter meridian (analogous to the quarter-circle), also known as the Earth quadrant, is

It was part of the historical definition of the metre and of the nautical mile.

The quarter meridian can be expressed in terms of the complete elliptic integral of the second kind,

where  are the first and second eccentricities.

The quarter meridian is also given by the following generalized series:

(For the formula of c0, see section #Generalized series above.)
This result was first obtained by James Ivory.

The numerical expression for the quarter meridian on the WGS84 ellipsoid is

The polar Earth's circumference is simply four times quarter meridian:

The perimeter of a meridian ellipse can also be rewritten in the form of a rectifying circle perimeter, . Therefore, the rectifying Earth radius is:

The inverse meridian problem for the ellipsoid

In some problems, we need to be able to solve the inverse problem: given , determine . This may be solved by Newton's method, iterating

until convergence.  A suitable starting guess is given by  where

is the rectifying latitude.

Alternatively, Helmert's series for the meridian distance can be reverted to give

where

where

Adrien-Marie Legendre showed that the distance along a geodesic on an spheroid is the same as the distance along the perimeter of an ellipse. The requisite series extended to sixth order are given by Charles Karney, Eqs.

See also

References

External links 
 Online computation of meridian arcs on different geodetic reference ellipsoids

Geodesy
Meridians (geography)
History of measurement